The 1989 California Angels season saw the Angels finish third in the American League West with a record of 91 wins and 71 losses.

Offseason
November 3, 1988: Mike Cook, Paul Sorrento, and Rob Wassenaar (minors) were traded by the Angels to the Minnesota Twins for Bert Blyleven and Kevin Trudeau (minors).
January 11, 1989: Max Venable was signed as a free agent by the Angels.
March 9, 1989: DeWayne Buice was traded by the California Angels to the Toronto Blue Jays for Cliff Young.

Regular season
 September 9, 1989: Devon White became the first member of the Angels to steal three bases in one inning. The opponent was the Boston Red Sox.

Season standings

Record vs. opponents

All-Star game

The 1989 Major League Baseball All-Star Game was the 60th playing of the midsummer classic between the all-stars of the American League (AL) and National League (NL), the two leagues comprising Major League Baseball. The game was held on July 11, 1989, at Anaheim Stadium in Anaheim, California, the home of the California Angels of the American League. The game resulted in the American League defeating the National League 5-3. The game is remembered for Bo Jackson's monstrous lead-off home run to center field.

Notable transactions
 June 5, 1989: Chad Curtis was drafted by the California Angels in the 45th round of the 1989 amateur draft. Player signed June 11, 1989.

Roster

Player stats

Batting

Starters by position
Note: Pos = Position; G = Games played; AB = At bats; H = Hits; Avg. = Batting average; HR = Home runs; RBI = Runs batted in

Other batters
Note: G = Games played; AB = At bats; H = Hits; Avg. = Batting average; HR = Home runs; RBI = Runs batted in

Pitching

Starting pitchers
Note: G = Games; IP = Innings pitched; W = Wins; L = Losses; ERA = Earned run average; SO = Strikeouts

Other pitchers
Note: G = Games pitched; IP = Innings pitched; W = Wins; L = Losses; ERA = Earned run average; SO = Strikeouts

Relief pitchers
 Note: G = Games pitched; W = Wins; L = Losses; SV = Saves; ERA = Earned run average; SO = Strikeouts

Farm system

References

1989 California Angels at Baseball Reference
1989 California Angels  at Baseball Almanac

Los Angeles Angels seasons
California Angels season
Los